Barry Christopher Roche (born 6 April 1982) is an Irish former professional footballer who played as a goalkeeper and now works as a goalkeeping coach for Morecambe. He is a former Irish Under-21 international.

Career

Nottingham Forest
Born in the town of Wicklow, Roche played at Leeds United, before following Paul Hart to Nottingham Forest. He made his debut for Forest on 28 August 2000 as a substitute in a 3–2 win at Crystal Palace in the Football League First Division, saving a late twice-taken Julian Gray penalty kick. During his time at the club he was mainly an understudy to Darren Ward and Paul Gerrard and made just 10 first team starts. He was released at the end of the 2004–05 season.

Chesterfield
Roche signed for Chesterfield on 26 July 2005 after an impressive trial at the club. He established himself as the club's first choice goalkeeper, although he briefly lost his place due to a dip in form during the 2006–07 season. In May 2007 he signed a new two-year contract with Chesterfield, who had just been relegated from League One.

Morecambe
In June 2008 Chesterfield allowed Roche to move to fellow League Two side Morecambe despite him having another year remaining on his contract. He signed a two-year contract with his new club. Roche kept his first clean sheet for Morecambe in their 1–0 win over Shrewsbury Town on 6 September 2008. He has since made a name for himself with the Morecambe faithful with some inspired performances and has won their Player of the Season twice.
In 2010, he was appointed Morecambe FC club captain. On 21 January 2012, Roche signed a new contract that keeps him until June 2014.

On 3 May 2014, Roche signed a new contract at the Shrimps which will keep him until June 2016.

Roche scored his first career goal on 2 February 2016 with a 94th-minute equaliser to secure a 1–1 draw against Portsmouth.

In May 2018 he signed a new one-year contract with Morecambe. He signed a further one-year contract in June 2019. 

Following Jim Bentley's departure as manager on 28 October 2019, Roche assumed the role of caretaker player-manager, alongside Kevin Ellison. Roche's only match in charge was the 1-0 home win against Leyton Orient in League Two on 2 November 2019. Derek Adams was appointed Morecambe team manager on 7 November 2019. 

Roche was released by Morecambe at the end of the 2019-20 season. He announced his retirement on 22 June, intending to concentrate on coaching, and on 16 July, it was officially announced that Roche would take up a permanent role as goalkeeper coach at the club.

Career statistics

Club

References

External links

1982 births
Association footballers from County Dublin
Living people
Association football goalkeepers
Republic of Ireland association footballers
Republic of Ireland expatriate association footballers
Republic of Ireland youth international footballers
Republic of Ireland under-21 international footballers
Expatriate footballers in England
Leeds United F.C. players
Nottingham Forest F.C. players
Chesterfield F.C. players
Morecambe F.C. players
Morecambe F.C. non-playing staff
English Football League players
Association football goalkeeping coaches